Phyllis Green is an artist whose practice involves sculpture, video and installation art. Based in Santa Monica, she has received a Guggenheim Fellowship, as well as grants from the City of Santa Monica, California Community Foundation, Durfee Foundation, Pollock-Krasner Foundation, California Arts Council, National Endowment for the Arts, Canada Council and British Columbia Cultural Fund. In 1996, she was among the first to be awarded a C.O.L.A. grant by the City of Los Angeles. In 2000, she was appointed to the Santa Monica Arts Commission, serving, as its chair from 2004 to 2006. She is married to the photographer Ave Pildas.

Early life and career
Although Green was born in Minneapolis, she grew up in Winnipeg and attended the University of Manitoba, where she earned a Bachelor of Arts in 1971. Her crocheted Boob Tree (1975) was the catalog-cover and poster image for "Woman as Viewer," an all-women artists exhibition at the Winnipeg Art Gallery. Thirty-six years later, she restored Boob Tree for "Winter Kept Us Warm" (2012) at Plug In ICA, Winnipeg, Manitoba. Exemplary of its feminist icon status, painter Margaret Shaw-MacKinnon included a painted photo of it in her painting Boob Tree Revisited: Forty Years to Measure Change (2019).

In 1978, she moved to California to pursue graduate studies in art and earned an MFA from the University of California Los Angeles in 1981.

Green's earlier works grew out of the Feminist Art Movement, while her recent work has found inspiration in the Vedas, Hindu's sacred scripture. Doug Harvey notes how her "formally beautiful body of work somehow engages art history, contemporary social and political issues and heartfelt mystical spiritualty without missing a beat.

Career Survey (2011)
In 2011, Green's survey Splendid Entities: 25 Years of Objects by Phyllis Green opened at the Ben Maltz Gallery, Otis College of Art and Design, Los Angeles, CA.

The body of work for which Green has received the most recognition is known as the Turkish Bath (1994) series, which was inspired by a late Jean-Auguste-Dominique Ingres painting of the same name.  Art historian Jeanne Willette contrasts both artists' efforts: "Pink and nude female slaves loll indolently, smile demurely, and are displayed for the pleasure of the male viewer. This overabundance of available female flesh is one of the more compelling images of the conspicuous consumption of human beings from the previous century. For the feminist Green, the idea of woman-as-commodity at the mercy of the male consumer is demeaning. In response, the artist sought to redeem femininity by addressing issues of decoration and ornament in her own version of Ingre's The Turkish Bath."

Solo exhibitions
Green has had solo exhibitions at numerous commercial galleries, including Chimento Contemporary (2017), LAM Gallery (2015), Susanne Vielmetter Los Angeles Projects (2003), Lemon Sky Projects (1998), LASCA Gallery (1996) and Jan Baum Gallery (1988, 1990, 1993 and 1994), as well as Los Angeles Central Library(2013), and university galleries tied to Mount St. Mary's University (2016), Otis College of Art and Design (2011), Long Beach City College (1988 and 2009), Rio Hondo College (1995), Cal-State Bakersfield (1994), Pierce College (1991), Whittier College (1987) among others.

Group exhibitions
In addition to being included in Los Angeles County Art Museum's Made in California: Art, Image and Identity (2000), Green's sculptures have been featured in national exhibitions at Long Beach Museum of Art, Santa Monica Museum of Art, the Getty Center, Mulvane Art Museum(Topeka), Tucson Museum of Art, Laguna Art Museum, Arizona State University Art Museum, UCLA Hammer Museum, as well as international exhibitions in Berlin, Venice, Bohemia, Shanghai and Glasgow.

Teaching, Curating, Radio
Green was co-director of the Christopher Isherwood Foundation in Santa Monica from 2011 to 2018.  She taught at University of Southern California's Roski School of Art and Design from 2002 to 2015. From 1996 to 2008, she taught at the University of California Los Angeles and from 1989 to 2011, she taught in the Art Department of Loyola Marymount University, Los Angeles. In 2003, she was a visiting artist at the University of Colorado, Boulder. She also taught at California State University-Fullerton in 1998, Glendale Community College in 1992, Claremont Graduate University in 1990 and Emily Carr College of Art from 1982 to 1983.

From 2007 to 2008, she curated the Scripps Annual, Scripps College, Claremont, CA

From 1996 to 1998, she hosted the radio show "LOOK/ hear" on KXLU 88.9 FM in Los Angeles.

References

Selected bibliography
Michael Anderson. "Phyllis Green at Jan Baum." Art In America. January, 1989. 158–159.
Andy Bruner Reviews Splendid Entities
Scarlett Cheng. "Mud Gets off the Ground." Artillery. March–April 2016.
Doug Harvey. "Gender, Race".LA Weekly. August 4–10, 2000. p. 47.
Doug Harvey. "The Contrarian's Engagement: Current Figuration in the Art of Phyllis Green." Border Crossings. December 2018. pp 54–59.
Micol Hebron. "Multiple Vantage Points." Critic's Picks. Artforum.com. March 2007.
Susan Kandel. "An Inspired Mess." Los Angeles Times. July 29, 1993. F7.
Susan Kandel. “It’s Hot and Steamy in Phyllis Green’s ‘Turkish Bath’.” Los Angeles Times. November 17, 1994. F13.
Christopher Knight. "A COLA That Refreshes." Los Angeles Times. May 27, 1997. F1.
Kristine McKenna, Los Angeles Times. September 12, 1986, F8.
John David O'Brien."Phyllis Green: Ben Maltz Gallery." Artillery: Killer Text on Art.Vol 5 Issue 5. May/June 2011.
Leah Ollman."Art Reviews: Image Leaders."Los Angeles Times. July 21, 2000. F21.
Leah Ollman. "Sly messages in 'Walk the Walk'."Los Angeles Times. June 10, 2015.
Leah Ollman reviews "When clothes are more than clothes: Phyllis Green's designs are journeys, hung on a hanger
David Pagel. "Hit-and-Miss Affair in 'Sexy' Show." Los Angeles Times. February 16, 1996. F24.
Peter Selz. "The Figurative Impulse in Contemporary Ceramics." Jo Lauria (ed.).Color and Fire: Defining Moments in Studio Ceramics 1950-2000. New York: Rizzoli, 2000. pp. 187–189.
Sue Spaid. "L.A. Undercover: A Profile of the Alternative Projects." Art Papers. March/ April 1998. 22:2. 14–17.
Kay Whitney. "Serious Frills: A Conversation with Phyllis Green." Sculpture. March/April 2019. pp. 10–21.
William Wilson."'Head to Toe' Mixes Education, Fun." Los Angeles Times. February 28, 1998. F12.
William Zimmer. "'California Surrealism' in Bronx Show." New York Times. Sunday, February 5, 1989, p. 30.

External links
Phyllis Green's website
Tour Splendid Entities: 25 Years of Objects by Phyllis Green

American women artists
American artists
Living people
Year of birth missing (living people)
21st-century American women